Lake Leqinat or Lake Lićenat ( or Leqinati, or Liqeni i Kuqishtës) is a mountain lake found on the Mount Leqinat in the Prokletije range in western Kosovo. Lake Leqinat is just above the village of Kuqishtë.

See also 
 Lake Little Lićenat
 Bjeshkët e Nemuna National Park

References 

 
Leqinat
Accursed Mountains